Balwant Sharma (born 12 February 1953) is an Indian cricket umpire. He has stood in matches in the Ranji Trophy tournament.

References

External links
 

1953 births
Living people
Indian cricket umpires
Place of birth missing (living people)